Georgios Siakkas (born March 23, 1988) is a Greek footballer.

Career
Born in Mitrousi, Serres, Siakkas began playing football with local side Panserraikos in the Beta Ethniki.

External links
Profile at EPAE.org
Guardian Football
Profile at Onsports.gr

1988 births
Living people
Greek footballers
Panserraikos F.C. players
Ergotelis F.C. players
Doxa Drama F.C. players
Fokikos A.C. players
Athlitiki Enosi Larissa F.C. players
Association football midfielders
People from Kapetan Mitrousi
Footballers from Central Macedonia